Thunderstruck Run is a stream in the U.S. state of West Virginia.

Thunderstruck Run was named for the fact lightning strikes were relatively common there.

See also
List of rivers of West Virginia

References

Rivers of Preston County, West Virginia
Rivers of Tucker County, West Virginia
Rivers of West Virginia